Marien de La Asuncion (born 6 February 1989) is a French retired ice dancer who competes for Japan with skating partner Emi Hirai. Together, they are four-time Japanese national silver medalists and have competed at four Four Continents Championships.

Career 
De La Asuncion began skating in 2001. Following a partnership with Rowan Musson in the 2007–08 season, he competed with Chloé Ibanez in 2008–09 and 2009–10.

In 2011, de La Asuncion teamed up with Emi Hirai to compete for Japan. They took the silver medal at the 2011–12 Japan Championships. Making their international debut, they placed 14th at the 2012 Nebelhorn Trophy and 11th at the 2013 Four Continents Championships.

Hirai and de La Asuncion have appeared at two Grand Prix events, placing 8th at the 2014 NHK Trophy and 2015 NHK Trophy.

Hirai and de la Asuncion announced their retirement on May 8, 2017, on de la Asuncion's Twitter page.

Programs 
With Hirai

Competitive highlights 
GP: Grand Prix; CS: Challenger Series; JGP: Junior Grand Prix

With Hirai for Japan

With Musson and Ibanez for France

References

External links 
 

1989 births
French male ice dancers
Japanese male ice dancers
Living people
Sportspeople from Lyon